International trips made by the heads of state and heads of government to the United States have become a valuable part of American diplomacy and international relations since such trips were first made in the mid-19th century. They are complicated undertakings that often require months of planning along with a great deal of coordination and communication.

The first international visit to the United States was made by King Kalakaua of Hawaii in 1874, which was the first visit by a foreign chief of state or head of government.

The first African head of state to visit the United States was President Edwin Barclay of Liberia in 1943.

Algeria

Angola

Benin

Botswana

Burkina Faso

Burundi

Cameroon

Cape Verde

Central African Republic

Chad

Comoros

Congo (Democratic Republic of) (Zaire)

Congo (Republic of) (Brazzaville)

Djibouti

Egypt

Equatorial Guinea

Eritrea

Ethiopia

Gabon

Gambia

Ghana

Guinea

Guinea-Bissau

Ivory Coast (Côte d'Ivoire)

Kenya

Lesotho

Liberia

Libya

Madagascar

Malawi

Mali

Morocco

Mauritania

Mauritius

Mozambique

Namibia

Niger

Nigeria

Madagascar

Rwanda

Seychelles

Senegal

Sierra Leone

Somalia

South Africa

South Sudan

Sudan

Swaziland

Tanzania

Togo

Tunisia

Uganda

Zambia

Zimbabwe

See also

 Foreign policy of the United States
 Foreign relations of the United States
 List of international trips made by presidents of the United States
 List of diplomatic visits to the United States
 State visit

References

External links
 Visits by Foreign Leaders – Office of the Historian (United States Department of State)

Africa